Attorney General Wright may refer to:

James Wright (governor) (1716–1785), Attorney General of the Province of South Carolina
Jeremy Wright (born 1972), Attorney General for England and Wales
Luke Edward Wright (1846–1922), Attorney General of Tennessee